Bonanza Jr./Sr. High School is a junior/senior public high school located in Bonanza, Oregon, United States.

Background
The school serves students in grades 7 through 12 in the city of Bonanza, as well as the outlying communities of Sprague River, Dairy, Bly, Beatty, and Langell Valley, the Yonna and Poe valley areas, and the surrounding region. The school's bus drivers drive 520 miles a day, because the school's attendance area covers nearly 950 square miles, with students living as far as 55 miles from the school and having to travel on the school bus up to three hours a day.

The school building also houses Bonanza Elementary School, serving K through 6th grade. Collectively the school is called Bonanza School, and the high school portion is known as Bonanza High School.

Building
Construction of the current school building began in 1944, after a fire destroyed the previous school in 1943. The center and right wings of the school were set to be completed in early 1945, and the remaining wing was to be completed when more funds became available.

Athletics 
The school's mascot is the "Antlers" and the team colors are scarlet, black, and white. The school belongs to the Oregon School Activities Association and participates in the Mountain View Conference. Sports teams play in Class 2A-3, based on school enrollment.

References

External links
 "Bonanza School: Then and Now", by Donald V. Philpott from Klamath Country History, Klamath County Historical Society, 1984

High schools in Klamath County, Oregon
Public high schools in Oregon
Public middle schools in Oregon